Spinareovirinae is a subfamily of double-stranded RNA viruses in the family Reoviridae. Viruses in this group are distinguished by the presence of a turreted protein on the inner capsid. (Spina = spiny or thorny in Latin.)

Taxonomy 

The subfamily has nine genera: 
 
Aquareovirus
Coltivirus
Cypovirus
Dinovernavirus
Fijivirus
Idnoreovirus
Mycoreovirus
Orthoreovirus
Oryzavirus

References 

 
Reoviruses
Virus subfamilies